The railway from Tours to Le Mans is a French 96-kilometre long railway line. It is used for passenger (express, regional and suburban) and freight traffic. The railway was opened in 1858.

The line is non-electrified, only around Tours and Le Mans.

Main stations
 Tours station
 Château-du-Loir station
 Le Mans station

References

Railway lines in Centre-Val de Loire
Railway lines in Pays de la Loire